Purana is a genus of cicadas from Southeast Asia. Its distribution includes Java, Sumatra, Borneo, the Philippines, peninsular Malaysia, Thailand, India, Indochina, China, and Japan. Only one species has been recorded east of the Wallace Line, Purana celebensis, from Sulawesi. In all species the male possess two pairs of dark ventral abdominal tubercles on third and fourth sternites. The male opercula are rather short and generally do not reach beyond the posterior pair of tubercles. Related genera that also possess abdominal tubercles are Leptopsaltria, Maua, Nabalua and Tanna which together with Purana are in the subtribe Leptopsaltriina  of the tribe Leptopsaltriini.

Species
These 62 species belong to the genus Purana:

 Purana abdominalis Lee, 2009 c g
 Purana atroclunes Boulard, 2002 c g
 Purana australis (Kato, 1944) c g
 Purana barbosae (Distant, 1889) c g
 Purana campanula Pringle, 1955 c g
 Purana capricornis Kos & Gogala, 2000 c g
 Purana carmente (Walker, F., 1850) c g
 Purana carolettae Esaki, 1936 c g
 Purana celebensis (Breddin, 1901) c g
 Purana chueatae Boulard, 2007 c g
 Purana conifacies (Walker, F., 1858) c g
 Purana conspicua Distant, 1910 c g
 Purana crassinotata Lee, 2015 c g
 Purana davidi Distant, 1905 c g
 Purana dimidia Chou & Lei, 1997 c g
 Purana doiluangensis Boulard, 2005 c g
 Purana gemella Boulard, 2006 c g
 Purana gigas (Kato, 1930) c g
 Purana guttularis (Walker, F., 1858) c g
 Purana hermes Schouten & Duffels, 2002 c g
 Purana hirundo (Walker, F., 1850) c g
 Purana infuscata Schouten & Duffels, 2002 c g
 Purana iwasakii Matsumura, 1913
 Purana jacobsoni Distant, 1912 c g
 Purana jdmoorei Boulard, 2005 c g
 Purana johanae Boulard, 2005 c g
 Purana karimunjawa Duffels & Schouten, 2007 c g
 Purana khaosokensis Boulard, 2007 c g
 Purana khuanae Boulard, 2002 c g
 Purana khuniensis Boulard, 2005 c g
 Purana kpaworensis Boulard, 2006 c g
 Purana latifascia Duffels & Schouten, 2007 c g
 Purana metallica Duffels & Schouten, 2007 c g
 Purana mickhuanae Boulard, 2009 c g
 Purana montana Kos & Gogala, 2000 c g
 Purana morrisi (Distant, 1892) c g
 Purana mulu Duffels & Schouten, 2007 c g
 Purana nana Lee, 2009 c g
 Purana natae Boulard, 2006 c g
 Purana nebulilinea (Walker, F., 1868) c g
 Purana niasica Kos & Gogala, 2000 c g
 Purana notatissima Jacobi, 1944 c g
 Purana obducta Schouten & Duffels, 2002 c g
 Purana opaca Lee, 2009 c g
 Purana parvituberculata Kos & Gogala, 2000 c g
 Purana phetchabuna Boulard, 2008 c g
 Purana pigmentata Distant, 1905 c g
 Purana pryeri (Distant, 1881) c g
 Purana ptorti Boulard, 2007 c g
 Purana sagittata Schouten & Duffels, 2002 c g
 Purana taipinensis (Kato, 1944) c g
 Purana tanae Boulard, 2006 c g
 Purana tavoyana Ollenbach, 1928
 Purana tigrina (Walker, F., 1850) c g
 Purana tigrinaformis Boulard, 2007 c g
 Purana tigroides (Walker, 1858)
 Purana tripunctata Moulton, J.C., 1923 c g
 Purana trui Pham, Schouten & Yang, 2012 c g
 Purana ubina Moulton, J.C., 1923 c g
 Purana usnani Duffels & Schouten, 2007 c g
 Purana vesperalba Boulard, 2009 c g
 Purana vindevogheli Boulard, 2008 c g

Data sources: i = ITIS, c = Catalogue of Life, g = GBIF, b = Bugguide.net

References

Leptopsaltriini
Cicadidae genera
Hemiptera of Asia
Taxa named by William Lucas Distant